Djénébou Sissoko (born June 27, 1982 in San) is a Malian women's basketball player. Sissoko represented Mali, and competed as part of  the women's national basketball team at the 2008 Summer Olympics in Beijing. During the tournament, she scored a total of twenty-four points and thirty-two rebounds, including thirteen against the Czech Republic, in five group play games.

Sissoko is also a member of Djoliba AC women's basketball team in Bamako.

References

External links
FIBA Women's Basketball Profile
NBC Olympics Profile

1982 births
Living people
Malian women's basketball players
Olympic basketball players of Mali
Basketball players at the 2008 Summer Olympics
People from Ségou Region
21st-century Malian people